The 1994–95 Primera División de Fútbol Profesional season is the 43rd tournament of El Salvador's Primera División since its establishment of the National League system in 1948. The tournament started on the August28, 1994 and ended on the July 2, 1995. FAS won the championship match against LA Firpo 3-1.

Teams

Managerial changes

During the season

Final

Top scorers

List of foreign players in the league
This is a list of foreign players in 1994-1995. The following players:
have played at least one  game for the respective club.
have not been capped for the El Salvador national football team on any level, independently from the birthplace

C.D. Águila
  Alejandro Sequeira
  Agustin Castillo

Alianza F.C.
 
  Robert Weavert

Atletico Marte
 

Baygon-ADET
 

Cojutepeque
 

 (player released mid season)
  (player Injured mid season)
 Injury replacement player

El Roble
  German Perez
  Arnold Lopez
  Fabricio Perez
  Javier Padilla
  Carlos Rinaldi

C.D. FAS
  Fulgencio Deonel Bordón
  Ricardo Roberto Toro

C.D. Luis Ángel Firpo
  Fernando De Souza
  Celio da Rodriguez 
  Raul Toro
  Percibal Piggot

Limeno
 

Tiburones

External links
 
 
 

1995